The Committee of Selection is a committee of the House of Lords in the Parliament of the United Kingdom. The committee is appointed to propose members of select committees and the panel of Deputy Chairmen of Committees.

Membership
As of January 2023, the members of the committee are as follows:

See also
List of Committees of the United Kingdom Parliament

External links
Committee of Selection (UK Parliament page)

Selection